Kristina "Kicki" Marlene Ulander (born 16 September 1981) is a Swedish wheelchair curler.

Career
She participated at the 2014 Winter Paralympics and 2018 Winter Paralympics where Swedish team finished on seventh and tenth places respectively.

She started wheelchair curling in 2006 at the age of 25.

Teams

References

External links 

 Athlete profile - 2014 Winter Paralympics (web archive)
 
 Video: 

Living people
1981 births
Sportspeople from Västernorrland County
Swedish female curlers
Swedish wheelchair curlers
Paralympic wheelchair curlers of Sweden
Wheelchair curlers at the 2014 Winter Paralympics
Wheelchair curlers at the 2018 Winter Paralympics
Wheelchair curlers at the 2022 Winter Paralympics
Medalists at the 2022 Winter Paralympics
Paralympic medalists in wheelchair curling
Paralympic silver medalists for Sweden
Swedish wheelchair curling champions
21st-century Swedish women